Akhsitan III was the 29th ruler of Shirvan, now part of Azerbaijan. He was the son of Shirvanshah Farrukhzad II.

Reign
His name is first recorded in Safvat as-safa, a work by Tawakkul b. Bazzaz, a medieval biographer, who mentions Akhsitan as ruler of Shirvan. Shah wanted to marry his daughter to Safavid sheikh Safi-ad-din Ardabili with a dowry of 14.000 Iranian toman and a water canal. But seeing Safiaddin's tutor and future father-in-law Zahed Gilani's influence over Shirvani people Akhsitan began to oppose religious Sufi orders. He died in 1294 of mental illness.

References

1294 deaths
Year of birth unknown
13th-century Iranian people